Richard Charles Hussey, often referred to as R. C. Hussey, was a British architect. He was in partnership with Thomas Rickman from 1835, whose practice he assumed in 1838 with the latter's failing health; Rickman died on 4 January 1841.

Works
1838: Bishop Ryder Church, Birmingham
1838-1839 Christ Church, Clevedon
1841: St Matthew's parish church, Warwick Street, Rugby, Warwickshire
1843: rebuilt west front of Holy Trinity parish church, Coventry
1843–4: restorations to Chester Cathedral, Cheshire
1844: rebuilt St Peter's parish church, Barford, Warwickshire
1844: raised roof of SS Mary and Nicholas parish church, Littlemore, Oxfordshire
1845: west tower of All Saints' parish church, Old Grendon, Warwickshire
1846: St John the Evangelist parish church, Stoke Row, Oxfordshire
1846–8: rebuilt St Mary's parish church, Frittenden, Kent
1848–51: St John the Evangelist parish church, school and vicarage, Knypersley, Staffordshire
1849–50: St Saviour's parish church, Saltley, Birmingham
1850–51: rectory for St Michael's parish church, Winterbourne Steepleton, Dorset
1851–52: rebuilt nave of St Mary Magdalene parish church, Stockbury, Kent
1853–5: south arcade of St Catherine's parish church, Preston, Faversham, Kent
1854: rebuilt chancel, SS Peter and Paul parish church, Swalcliffe, Oxfordshire
1855: rebuilt chancel, St Margaret's Church, Halstead, Kent
1858: Rebuilt Nave and extended N. Transept St Mary and St Eanswythe's Church (1138), Folkestone, Kent
1859–62: south aisle at All Saints' parish church, Waldron, East Sussex
1860: rebuilt St Laurence parish church, South Weston, Oxfordshire
1861: spire and top of tower of St Martin of Tours parish church, Detling, Kent

References

Sources

External links
 

1806 births
1887 deaths
Architects of cathedrals
19th-century English architects
English ecclesiastical architects
Gothic Revival architects